Eupithecia pollens is a moth in the family Geometridae. It is found in China.

References

Moths described in 1981
pollens
Moths of Asia